Laurent Capet (born 5 May 1972 in Dieppe, Seine-Maritime) is a French volleyball player, who won the bronze medal with the Men's National Team at the 2002 World Championships in Argentina.

International Competitions
1993 – European Championship (9th place)
1997 – European Championship (4th place)
1999 – World League (7th place)
1999 – European Championship (6th place)
2000 – World League (7th place)
2001 – World League (6th place)
2001 – European Championship (7th place)
2002 – World League (7th place)
2002 – World Championship (bronze medal)
2003 – World League (10th place)
2003 – European Championship (silver medal)
2003 – FIVB World Cup (5th place)
2004 – World League (5th place)
2004 – Summer Olympics (9th place)

References
 L'Equipe Profile

External links 
 
 

1972 births
Living people
Sportspeople from Dieppe, Seine-Maritime
Volleyball players at the 2004 Summer Olympics
Olympic volleyball players of France
French men's volleyball players